Seong-han, also spelled Sung-han, is a Korean unisex given name. Its meaning differs based on the hanja used to write each syllable of the name. There are 27 hanja with the reading "seong" and 23 hanja with the reading "han" on the South Korean government's official list of hanja which may be registered for use in given names.

People with this name include:
Seonghan of Silla, politician of the Silla Dynasty
Kim Seong-han (novelist) (1919–2010), South Korean male novelist
Kim Seong-han (baseball) (born 1958), South Korean male baseball player
Im Sung-han (born 1960), South Korean television screenwriter

See also
List of Korean given names

References

Korean unisex given names